The Eighth Regiment Armory, located in the Black Metropolis-Bronzeville District of Chicago, Illinois, was the first armory in the United States built for an African-American military regiment, known as the "Fighting 8th". The building later was used by a division of the Illinois National Guard, and during World War I was incorporated into the US Infantry.  After closing the armory in the early 1960s, it became the South Central Gymnasium. In 1999, following an extensive renovation, it was reopened as a public high school military academy. The restoration and conversion into a school has been recognized by the National Trust for Historic Preservation.

The nearby Victory Monument honors the regiment for service during World War I.

The armory was listed on the National Register of Historic Places on April 30, 1986, and was designated as a Chicago Landmark on September 9, 1998.  It is one of nine landmark structures in the Black Metropolis-Bronzeville District. In currently houses the Chicago Military Academy.

In popular culture
On June 27, 1937, the armory hosted a battle of the bands, featuring big bands.  The Roy Eldridge's band began the show, followed by the 16 piece Benny Goodman band, with Gene Krupa on the drums and Harry James on the trumpet.  The popular tune King Porter Stomp was a highlight of the evening.

See also
Chicago architecture
Chicago Landmark
370th Infantry Regiment (United States)

Notes

Douglas, Chicago
Infrastructure completed in 1914
Armories on the National Register of Historic Places in Illinois
Buildings and structures in Chicago
Chicago Landmarks
Government buildings on the National Register of Historic Places in Chicago
Military installations in Illinois
African-American history in Chicago
1914 establishments in Illinois